The Salmon River is a braided stream that flows through Hyder, Alaska, and empties into the Portland Canal. It is fed by meltwater from the Salmon Glacier, which is located within British Columbia approximately 13 miles north of its confluence into the Canal and is road-accessible from the town of Stewart, British Columbia.

See also
List of Alaska rivers
List of British Columbia rivers
Premier, British Columbia

References

Rivers of the North Coast of British Columbia
Rivers of Prince of Wales–Hyder Census Area, Alaska
Rivers of Alaska
International rivers of North America
Rivers of the Boundary Ranges
Stewart Country
Rivers of Unorganized Borough, Alaska
Cassiar Land District